Eden is the debut studio album by the British musical duo Everything but the Girl. It was released on 4 June 1984 by Blanco y Negro Records. The album contains the single "Each and Every One", which peaked at number 28 on the UK Singles Chart. The cover design was by lead singer Tracey Thorn's former colleague in Marine Girls, Jane Fox.

Background and release 
Eden was the first professional recording by EBTG with a bigger company and a proper producer, Robin Millar, who was parallelly producing Sade's Diamond Life. Though it was finished in the autumn of 1983, it wasn't released until June 1984 due to contractual obligations between the band and Cherry Red Records.

By the time Eden was finally released, EBTG felt it didn't represent their current sound and interests and did very little promotion to it. "Each and Every One", the only single, became a UK Top 40 single the surpassed the band's expectations and previous efforts

In the time between recording and releasing Eden, Thorn and Watt opened themselves to new influences, mostly The Smiths, with whom they became close. "Never Could Have Been Worse" (the b-side to "Each and Every One") showed this influence in sound and lyrics. This was part of the band's following two singles.

"Mine" was released only four weeks after Eden, and marked a departure from the album's themes and sound, with Thorn singing about a single mother and gender politics involved in surnames. It reached No. 58 in the UK Singles Chart. "Native Land", which featured Smith's Johnny Marr in harmonica, only reached to No. 73. Although these weren't included in Eden, they did make the US only album Everything but the Girl.

Critical reception 

Eden was met with critical acclaim and NME ranked it number 20 among the "Albums of the Year" for 1984.

By 2012, Eden had sold around 500,000 copies. Eden was reissued in 2012 as a remastered two-disc deluxe set by Edsel Records.

Track listing

2012 Edsel Records reissue

Personnel
Everything but the Girl
Tracey Thorn – vocals, acoustic guitar
Ben Watt – guitars, vocals, Hammond organ, piano, horn arrangements

Additional musicians
Simon Booth – guitar
Joao Bosco De Oliveira – percussion
Charles Hayward – drums
Chucho Merchán – double bass
Dick Pearce – flugelhorn
Nigel Nash – tenor saxophone
Pete King – alto saxophone

Technical
Mike Pela – engineering
Jane Fox – cover design

Charts

Certifications

References

1984 debut albums
Everything but the Girl albums
Blanco y Negro Records albums
Albums produced by Robin Millar
Bossa nova albums
Jangle pop albums
Indie pop albums by English artists
Jazz-pop albums